Things We Do For Love is a 1997 play by British playwright Alan Ayckbourn, premièred as the Stephen Joseph Theatre. It is about a woman who begins an affair with her best friend's fiancé, only for this new relationship to swiftly descend into violence. It was the first Ayckbourn play to be performed on the end-stage in the theatre's new end-space at its current site, and was performed with three floors in view: head-level of the basement, the whole of the ground floor and foot-level of the top floor.

External links
 Things We Do For Love on official Ayckbourn site

Plays by Alan Ayckbourn
1997 plays